Lasse Holmgaard (born 10 April 1981) is a former Danish football player and current manager.

Career
Holmgaard started his playing career at Hvidovre IF i 2001. He then moved on to play for BK Skjold in the Danish 1st Division.

In January 2005 he joined AC Horsens in the  Danish Superliga. He played 19 games in one and a half year, and then he moved to Lolland-Falster Alliancen in the Danish 2nd Divisions in order to get more time on the field.

In 2009 he returned to his childhood club NB Bornholm to become player-manager. In 2012 he got the team promoted to the Danish 2nd Divisions for the first time in the club's history. However, the team got relegated to the Denmark Series after only one season.

In 2018 he left NB Bornholm in order to take up the manager role at Boldklubben Frem. He lef the club at the end of the 2018/19 season.

On 5 October 2020 he was named new manager of Brønshøj Boldklub. He left his position on 9 June 2021 after disagreements with the club.

References

External links 
Lasse Holmgaard at SuperStats

1981 births
Living people
Danish men's footballers
Danish Superliga players
Hvidovre IF players
BK Skjold players
AC Horsens players
Danish football managers
Boldklubben Frem managers
Brønshøj BK managers
Association football midfielders
Sportspeople from the Capital Region of Denmark